Neeraj Kumar (born 25 October 1970) is an Indian politician. He was elected to the Bihar Legislative Assembly from Barari in 2015 to 2020 as a member of the Rashtriya Janata Dal and contested the 2020 assembly elections from RJD's symbol from Barari.                              

 

Neeraj kumar

Member Of Legislative Assembly

In Office   

2015-2020

Constituency                      Barari

personal details

Neeraj kumar 

Born 

25 October 1970(age 52)

At post : Pothia

District : Katihar

political party                Janta Dal (1990-1997) 

Rashtriya Janata Dal (1997- Till now)

Residence                      Pothia, Falka, Katihar 

Alma mater                            Graduated

Profession.                     Politician, Social Worker, agriculturist

References  

https://myneta.info/bihar2015/candidate.php?candidate%20id=3183
https://www.latestly.com/elections/assembly-elections/bihar/2015/barari/
https://hindi.news18.com/assembly-election-2020/bihar-chunav/neeraj-kumar-s04a068c02-rashtriya-janata-dal-profile/
https://www.livehindustan.com/bihar/katihar/story-burari-opposition-to-shifting-of-referral-hospital-in-chc-5432023.html
https://anawarannews.com/former-burari-mla-neeraj-yadav-meets-hyderabad-fire-victims/

1970 births
Living people